The 2006 season was the 84th season of competitive football in Ecuador.

National leagues

Serie A

Champion: El Nacional (13th title)
International cup qualifiers:
2007 Copa Libertadores: El Nacional, Emelec, LDU Quito
2006 Copa Sudamericana: LDU Quito
2007 Copa Sudamericana: El Nacional
Relegated: ESPOLI (after first stage); Aucas (after second stage)

Serie B
Winner: 
Apertura: Deportivo Azogues (1st title)
Clausura: Imbabura (1st title)
Promoted: Deportivo Azogues (after first stage); Imbabura (after second stage)
Relegated: Esmeraldas Petrolero, Deportivo Quevedo

Segunda
Winner: Brasilia
Promoted: Brasilia, Municipal Cañar

Clubs in international competitions

National team

Senior team
The Ecuador national team played in eleven international matches: four during the 2006 FIFA World Cup, and seven friendlies.

FIFA World Cup

Ecuador played in their second consecutive FIFA World Cup.

Group stage

Ecuador was drawn into Group A along with Costa Rica, hosts Germany, and Poland. After shutout wins against Poland and Costa Rica, Ecuador secured a spot in the Round of 16. Their last match of group play was a loss to the host team, making them the group runner-up.

Round of 16
Ecuador was matched-up against Group B winner, England. Despite a close game, a free-kick goal by English captain David Beckham proved to be the difference in the game and were eliminated. To date, this is the furthest progression in the tournament.

Friendlies

External links
 National leagues details on RSSSF
 National teams details on RSSSF

 
2006